Abburi Ramakrishna Rao was a pioneer of modern Telugu literature. He was a progressive Telugu writer, scholar, novelist, playwright, literary critic, humanist, professor of Library Science, and the Librarian. Gurajada Apparao, Rayaprolu Subbarao, and Abburi Ramakrishna Rao were considered as the trio of modern poetry, as all their works were published in the same period.

Family 
Ramakrishna Rao was born in a scholar's family on May 20, 1896, to Lakshmi Narasimha Shastri and Bapamma couple in Ananthavaram village, Tenali taluk of Guntur district. His grandfather was a poet and the father was a scholar in Sanskrit and Telugu languages. When Abburi was a child, the "Chellapilla Venkata Sastri", one of the duo poets of "Tirupati Venkata Kavulu"  was a frequent visitor to their house. Abburi was also a multilingual poet, who read thoroughly the Sanskrit, Telugu, English, Bengali, and Persian literature. At the age of 15, Abburi's family got him married to his maternal uncle's daughter "Rukmini". They have four sons and three daughters. His eldest son Late Abburi Varadarajeswara Rao, was a writer, critic, and Chairman of Official Linguistic Society. His daughter-in-law, Late Abburi Chayadevi was a modern feminist writer,  novelist,  and Sahitya Academy Awardee.  His second son, late Abburi Gopalakrishna,  was a painter and associated with several art institutions. He held several key positions and retired as the Director of Theatre Arts at Andhra University.

Education 
Abburi's schooling took place in Tenali till 5th grade. He passed Matriculation at "Mahabub College" in Secunderabad and also studied Arabic there. He joined "Noble College" to study FA (today's intermediate). There Balijepalli Lakshmikantam, Govindarajula Subba Rao became Abburi's friends.
When Abburi entered Sanskrit College in Mysore, the college principal was Kattamanchi Ramalingareddy. He read the Abburi's verse "Mallikamba" which was published in 1915. Abburi became a friend to Rallapalli Ananthakrishna Sharma also. Abburi learned "Veena" for a while from "Veena Seshanna" in 1916. The later three years of Abburi's fruitful life in Mysore contributed to his creativity. There he wrote classic verses like - "Vuhaagaanamu", "Nadee Sundari". He also wrote a poem namely "Andhra Kanthirava" (Lion among Andhra warriors) in praise of Kodi Ramamurthy. He went to Calcutta in 1918 to take admission to City College to pursue a B.A. There he became Vice-President of the Bengal Andhra Association after "Akkiraju Umapati", a scholar. After graduating with BA, he spent some time in Santiniketan and returned to Andhra Pradesh state. Abburi got the support of Congress leaders such as - "Bhogaraju Pattabhiramaiah", "Cherukuvada Venkata Narasimham", and of poets such as - "Chellapilla Venkata Sastri", "Tripuraneni Ramaswamy", "Mutnuri Krishnarao", the editor of "Krishna Patrika".

In Independence Movement 
In 1919, during the days of the independence movement in Andhra Pradesh, Abburi participated in the independence movement under the leadership of "Andhra Ratna Duggirala Gopalakrishnayya" who was conducting "Ramadandu". At that time Abburi has written a Burra Katha (Jangam Story) "Jallianwala Bhag" and performed at various places. It became popular among the public but banned by the then British government. This publication has also become unavailable very soon. Abburi was also affiliated with the trade unions and the leaders of the Communist Party. It was on that occasion that he became close to "Puchhapalli Sundarayya" and "MN Roy".

In Literature 
Abburi wrote a poem "Jalanjali" as early as 1909 while studying in Fifth Form. Abburi spent his time at Santiniketan with Gurudev Rabindranath Tagore between the years 1917–19. Then he wrote verses - "Vuhaganam", Niradambarataa Bhaavanaa Balaalu". The poets, writers such as - Devulapalli Krishna Sastri, Srirangam Srinivasa Rao (Sri Sri), Balantrapu Rajanikanta Rao, and linguists like Professor Bhadriraju Krishnamurthi regarded Abburi Ramakrishna Rao as their mentor and were addressing him as the master. They were having several literary discussions. Abburi suggested to the editor Nageshwara Rao Pantulu in his "Andhra Patrika" Magazine to introduce a new feature - "Sarasvatanubandham" in 1917–18. The feature was initiated with his article "Abhinava Kavita Prasamsa". Then in 1924–25, he made them initiate another new supplement "Rasamanjari" in that magazine. His poems reflect completeness, glory, augustness similar to the classical poems of the Sanskrit poetry. He added new styles to the poems of Nannaya. His literary versions include - "Chatuvulu", "Asuvulu", "Sonnets". In 1936, he joined with the writers like - "Premachand", "Najjad Zaheer", "Hiren Mukharjee" and established "All India Progressive Writers Association". He was one of the editors of the association journal "Indian Literature". In 1939 he established the "Indian Renaissance Association" joining with M.N.Roy, Lakshmana Sastri, Satchitananda Vatsayan, which has been instrumental in the literary revival.

In Plays, Theatre 
He was very fond of dramas. He wrote, directed plays, and also performed in cities - Hyderabad, Delhi. He acted in dramas like "Kanyasulkam", "Pratimasundari". He acted as "Ramappapantulu" in  "Kanyakulkam" drama and impressed the public. His association with drama organizations such as "Natali", "Natya goshti"  were examples of Abburi's service to theatre. In 1957, he played a key role in establishing the Academy of Music, Drama, Literature, and Fine Arts for Andhra Pradesh State Government. Following his suggestion, the Akasavani (Air-India Broadcasting) began broadcasting 90 minutes of national drama in 1957. He translated the drama "Mruchakatikam".  It was telecasted in Delhi Doordarshan when it began in Delhi and also performed in the presence of Dr. Sarvepalli Radhakrishnan at Rashtrapati Bhavan. After his retirement, he collaborated with A. R. Krishna, Minister Srinivasa Rao, and others to set up "Natya Vidyalaya" in Hyderabad, where he was directing dramas and began one-year certified studies in Theatre Arts. He gave a convocation address at the National School of Drama, Delhi.

Literary Works 
Vuhaganam, other works (Compilation Volume of Poetry). First edition 1973, Second edition published in 1994.
Mallikamba (1915–16) - published in Andhra Bharati Patrika
Nadisundari (play) - published in 1923
Erra Ganneru - published in 1924
SuryaRaju Cheppina Kathalu  - published in Krishna Patrika, 1923
Kalpana Kathalu - published in Krishna Patrika, 1923
Megha Lekhyamulu - published in Sarada Patrika, 1923
Mangalasutram (Crime Investigation Novel) - published in 1924.
Mangalasutram (Includes the novel and compilation of other stories) - published in 1995.
Vuhaganamu and other poetry - Kavita Publications collected literary works of Abburi and published as a compilation.

In Library, Library Science 
After establishing Andhra University (Andhra Vishwakala Parishad) in 1926, Kattumanchi Ramalingareddy became the Vice-Chancellor of the university and appointed Abburi in the library. When Sarvepalli Radhakrishnan was the Vice-Chancellor, Dr. M. O. Thomas was appointed  Librarian and Abburi was sent to Telugu department of university as the first faculty. He also taught the Sanskrit language there. Abburi Ramakrishna Rao was later appointed a university librarian and worked there for about 30 years. When he was appointed a librarian he did not qualify for a professional librarian position. He was awarded the honorary degree "Fellow of Library Association, London"  (FLA) from the British Library Association, London. Abburi as a librarian and a scholar of the literary, cultural sphere, many poets and scholars were consulting him. It contributed to the rise of the literary atmosphere in the Visakhapatnam area.
Recognizing the need for trained staff at different levels to ensure that proper functioning of libraries, Abburi introduced Library Science Course in Andhra University at Diploma level. His close association with Andhra University Vice-Chancellors, especially with Dr. V.S. Krishna helped him to develop the university library and library studies in the university. Abburi Ramakrishna Rao retired in 1960, 2/3 years later completing his term.

Regarding libraries, he said that "libraries are not orphanages....they should not develop like orphanages. When Kurnool was the capital of Andhra Pradesh, Abburi was actively involved in the State Library Committee's activities, discussed the issues of the public library movement,  contributing to the district librarians. Most of these librarians were his students. Abburi was instrumental in the creation of the Andhra Pradesh Library Act when the state of Andhra Pradesh was newly formed.

Titles, Honors 
He refused many titles and honours. The Andhra University, recognising the key role played by him for Telugu Literary Service, the development of the Andhra University University Library and Public Libraries conferred honorary doctorate with the title of "Kalaprapurna" to Abburi on August 3, 1974, in their 47th Convocation. He accepted only this award. After the formation of the Andhra Pradesh State in 1953, the State Government sought the advice and cooperation of Abburi in establishing the State Central Library in 1956 to widen the linkage of libraries in the newly created State of Vishalandra. As a president of the "Vishakha Writers' Association", he started editing "Nannayya Pada Suchi". He was affiliated with Kendra Sahitya Akademi and Kendra Sangeet Natak Academy. After the formation of "Sahitya Akademi", he planned for editing "Tikkanna" and other reference tools and the "Catalogue of 20th century Telugu Literary Publications". He translated Rabindranath Tagore's plays into Telugu in 1957–58 at the request of the Sahitya Academy.

Demise 
Abburi died on April 30, 1979. A few days before his death, Abburi asked Prof. Bhadriraju Krishnamurti to write his last poem, when he went to visit him -

Original Telugu Version (English Translation)
"chacchi poyi ecchata keguno ("Where does the living creature after dying?  
emi yaguno evarikerugaraadu (What happens to it?  No one knows that!) 
erukaleni vaaralememo cheppagaa (Ignorant people say vague things)
vini tapinchuvaaru venavelu" (Thousands listen and agonise over them")

Following Abburi's last request, his ashes were kept at M.N.Roy's grave in Dehradun.

External links 

 Abburi Samsmarana. Edited by Abburi Gopalakrishna. Hyderabad. Natyagoshti.1988
 Nageswera Rao,E. ABBURI RAMAKRISHNA RAU (Makers of Indian Literature; monograph). New Delhi: Sahitya Akademi, 2002.

References

Telugu poets
Telugu writers
Indian librarians
1896 births
1979 deaths
Poets from Andhra Pradesh
Writers from Andhra Pradesh